Barnacle is a surname. Notable people with the surname include:

Gary Barnacle (born 1959), English musician
Nora Barnacle (1884–1951), wife of author James Joyce
Pete Barnacle, drummer for a variety of bands
Thomas Barnacle (1846–1921), Irish trade unionist

See also
Neil Lyndon, (born 1946), English journalist and writer who was born "Neil Barnacle".
Barnicle